Catalyst Theatre is a multi-award-winning theatre company based in Edmonton, Alberta. Founded in 1977 as a social action theatre, it was taken over by Artistic Co-Directors Jonathan Christenson and Joey Tremblay in 1996. Christenson and Tremblay drastically changed the company's mandate to focus on "creating original Canadian work that explores new possibilities for the theatrical art form and the process through which it is created, to exposing the work locally, nationally and internationally, and to challenging the artists and audiences who participate in the creation of that work.” Since 2002, Catalyst Theatre has been developing new work under the creative leadership of Artistic Director Jonathan Christenson in collaboration with Resident Designer Bretta Gerecke. Catalyst Theatre's artistic team has created original productions that have toured the United Kingdom, Canada, Australia and the United States.

History 
Between 1978 and 1996, Catalyst Theatre’s offices were located in the Macleod Building in downtown Edmonton and later in the Garneau Community League on Edmonton’s southside. In 1996, Catalyst moved from the Garneau Community League to a derelict warehouse in Old Strathcona where they completed a renovation that included re-roofing, installing public washrooms, offices, lobby, studio and office space, dressing rooms, a green room and a performance space. The space was leased from the building’s owner, the Edmonton Jazz Society, which operates the Yardbird Suite, a performance venue at the north end of the same building.

In 2000, Catalyst raised the roof and removed the pillars, creating a 2400 SF black box theatre with 20-foot-high ceilings. From 2000 to 2015, the company developed and presented its productions in this space, as well as producing an annual international presenting series (“Blind Dates"). During this time, Catalyst also rented the theatre to the Edmonton International Fringe Festival each year as a Fringe Venue as well as renting to a variety of Edmonton-based theatre, music, and dance companies throughout the season.

In 2015, Catalyst became a resident company at the Citadel Theatre in downtown Edmonton and raised $1.2 million to renovate the Citadel’s Maclab Theatre and lobby and to build a suite of offices where they continue to be based. 

The black box theatre created by Catalyst Theatre continues to be an important part of Edmonton’s inventory of live performance venues and has been home to Theatre Network (2015 to 2021) and Workshop West Theatre (2022 to the present).

Between 1997 and the present, Catalyst has been presented at such festivals as the London International Festival of Theatre (LIFT), Luminato (Toronto), The Edinburgh Fringe, Carrefour International de Théâtre (Québec), PuSh Festival (Vancouver), High Performance Rodeo (Calgary), and Magnetic North (Ottawa). They have performed at such theatres as the Barbican Theatre (London), New World Stages (NYC), the New Victory Theatre (NYC), the Liverpool Playhouse, The Traverse (Edinburgh), The Tron (Glasgow), The Pleasance (London), La Caserne (Quebec), The National Arts Centre (Ottawa), Canadian Stage (Toronto), The Grand (London, ON), Theatre Calgary, Vertigo Theatre (Calgary), ATP (Calgary), Persephone Theatre (Saskatoon), The Globe (Regina), The Eric Harvie Theatre (Banff Centre for the Arts), Vancouver Playhouse, The Arts Club (Vancouver), and The Cultch (Vancouver), as well as many other theatres across Canada, the UK, the United States and Australia.

Productions

until the next breath (2020) 

Conceived by Jonathan Christenson and Bretta Gerecke. Text and Music by Jonathan Christenson. Directed by Jonathan Christenson. Design by Bretta Gerecke. Choreography by Laura Krewski. Music Production and Sound Design by Matthew Skopyk.

The Invisible - Agents of Ungentlemanly Warfare (2019) 

Book, lyrics and music by Jonathan Christenson. Directed by Jonathan Christenson. Production Design by Bretta Gerecke. Original Choreography by Laura Krewski. Music Production and Sound Design by Matthew Skopyk.

Fortune Falls (2016) 

Co-Written by Jonathan Christenson & Beth Graham. Directed and composed by Jonathan Christenson. Lighting and set design by Kerem Centinel. Costumes by Megan Koshka. Music Production and Sound Design by Matthew Skopyk.

Songs for Sinners & Saints (2016) 

A concert review of all previous works. Directed by Jonathan Christenson.

All Our Unworldly Possessions (2015) 

Conceived by Jonathan Christenson and Bretta Gerecke. A season-long installation piece.

Vigilante (2015) 

Book, music and lyrics by Jonathan Christenson. Directed by Jonathan Christenson. Choreographed by Laura Krewski. Set Design by Jonathan Christenson with James Robert Boudreau. Lighting Design by Beth Kates. Costume Design by Narda McCarroll. Music Production and by Matthew Skopyk. Sound Design by Wade Staples. This original rock musical follows the story of the Donnelly family, as they escaped their homeland of Ireland to the rough country-side of Ontario.

The Soul Collector (2013) 
Book, music and lyrics by Jonathan Christenson. Directed by Jonathan Christenson. Choreographed by Marie Nychka. Production Design by Bretta Gerecke. Music Production by Matthew Skopyk. Sound Design by Wade Staples.

Whisper (2012) 

Text by Jonathan Christenson and the Ensemble. Directed by Jonathan Christenson. Music by Jonathan Christenson with Matthew Skopyk. Production Design by Bretta Gerecke.Choreography by Laura Krewski. Sound Design by Matthew Skopyk. In 2012, Catalyst produced Whisper in association with Studio Theatre at the University of Alberta, which was performed by the school's BFA Acting class of 2012.

Hunchback (2011) 
Book, music and lyrics by Jonathan Christenson, from Victor Hugo's Notre Dame de Paris. Directed by Jonathan Christenson. Production Design by Bretta Gerecke. Original Choreography by Laura Krewski. Music Production by Matthew Skopyk. Sound Design by Wade Staples.

Nevermore: The Imaginary Life and Mysterious Death of Edgar Allan Poe (2009) 

Book, music and lyrics by Jonathan Christenson, from the works of Edgar Allan Poe. Directed by Jonathan Christenson. Production Design by Bretta Gerecke. Original Choreography by Laura Krewski. Music Production by Matthew Skopyk. Sound Design by Wade Staples. Nevermore had an 11-week Off-Broadway run at New World Stages from January 14, 2015 to March 29, 2015. On June 16, 2015, The Original Off-Broadway Cast Recording of Nevermore – The Imaginary Life and Mysterious Death of Edgar Allan Poe soundtrack was released by Broadway Records. This was Catalyst's first soundtrack album.

Frankenstein (2007) 
Book, music and lyrics by Jonathan Christenson. Directed by Jonathan Christenson. Production Design by Bretta Gerecke. Original Choreography by Laura Krewski. Music Production by Matthew Skopyk. Sound Design by Wade Staples. From Mary Shelley's 1813 novel, Frankenstein.

Sticky Shoes (2005) 

Created by Jonathan Christenson and Bretta Gerecke.

Love + Love (2004) 

Created by Jonathan Christenson, Annie Dugan, Bretta Gerecke, and John Ullyatt.

Carmen Angel (2003) 

Written by Joey Tremblay. Directed by Jonathan Christenson. Music composed by Jonathan Christenson. Production Design by Bretta Gerecke. Sound Design by Wade Staples.

Dream Life (2003) 

Written by Chris Craddock. Directed by Jonathan Christenson. Music composed by Jonathan Christenson. Production Design by Jonathan Christenson.

The Blue Orphan (2001) 

Written by Jonathan Christenson and Joey Tremblay. Directed by Jonathan Christenson. Music composed by Jonathan Christenson. Production Design by Bretta Gerecke. Sound Design by Wade Staples.

The House of Pootsie Plunket (1999) 

Written and directed by Joey Tremblay and Jonathan Christenson. Sound Design by Jonathan Christenson. Production Design by Bretta Gerecke.

Songs for Sinners (1998) 

Written and directed by Joey Tremblay and Jonathan Christenson. Music composed by Paul Morgan Donald, Jonathan Christenson, and Joey Tremblay. Production Design by Bretta Gerecke.

Abundance (1997) 

Written and directed by Joey Tremblay, Jonathan Christenson, and company. Production Design by Bretta Gerecke.

Electra (1996) 

Written and directed by Joey Tremblay and Jonathan Christenson. Music and Sound by Jonathan Christenson. Production Design by Bretta Gerecke.

Elephant Wake (1996) 
Written by Joey Tremblay and Jonathan Christenson. Directed by Jonathan Christenson.

My Perfect Heaven (1996) 

Written by Joey Tremblay and Jonathan Christenson. Music composed by Jonathan Christenson. Directed by Jonathan Christenson.

Awards and nominations

References

External links
Official Site

Theatre in Edmonton
Theatre companies in Alberta
Performing groups established in 1977